Palpimanus hesperius is a spider species of the family Palpimanidae that is endemic on São Tomé Island. It was first named in 1907 by Eugène Simon.

Its female holotype measures from 8 to 9 mm

References

Endemic fauna of São Tomé Island
Palpimanidae
Spiders of Africa
Taxa named by Eugène Simon
Spiders described in 1907